Takenori (written: , , , , ,  or ) is a masculine Japanese given name. Notable people with the name include:

, Japanese samurai
, Japanese baseball player
, Japanese footballer
Takenori Hiraishi (born 1960), Japanese golfer
Takenori Ito, Japanese mixed martial artist
, Japanese politician
, Japanese samurai
, Japanese French horn player, classical composer, conductor and music educator
, Japanese mixed martial artist

Japanese masculine given names